The MNL-2 2017 is the MNL-2's fifth full regular season.

Name Change
Horizon FC name changed to City Yangon.

Personnel and sponsoring
Note: Flags indicate national team as has been defined under FIFA eligibility rules. Players may hold more than one non-FIFA nationality.

Foreign players
The number of foreign players is restricted to four per MNL-2 club. A team can use three foreign players on the field in each game, including a slot for a player from among AFC countries.

Result

League table
Below is the league table for 2017 season.

Source: (B) Banned from MNL-2 due to finance problem.

Matches

Fixtures and Results of the Myanmar National League 2017 season.

Week 1

Week 2

Week 3

Week 4

Week 5

Week 6

Week 7

Week 8

Week 9

Week 10

Week 11

Week 12

Week 13

Week 14

Week 15

Week 16

Week 17

Week 18

Week 19

Week 20

Top scorers

References

External links
 Myanmar National League Official Website
 Myanmar National League Facebook Official Page

MNL-2 seasons
1
Myanmar
Myanmar